Acianthera capanemae is a species of orchid plant native to Brazil.

References 

capanemae
Flora of Brazil